Dorchester Abbey Museum is a local museum in the town of Dorchester, Oxfordshire, England. It is attached to Dorchester Abbey.

The museum occupies two buildings on the site of Dorchester Abbey. The Old Schoolroom, part of the former 14th-century guest house of the abbey, has displays of artefacts, illustrations and maps concerning the history of Dorchester and its surroundings. The area has been inhabited for over 6,000 years. It also houses a historical archive. The Cloister Gallery is a new gallery on the northern wall of the Abbey, built in 2001. It displays a permanent exhibition, "If Stones Could Speak", presenting the Abbey using its collection of carved and moulded medieval stonework.

The museum was short-listed for the 2006 Gulbenkian Prize for the Cloister Gallery.

References

External links 
 Dorchester Abbey Museum website
 Information Britain entry

Museums in Oxfordshire
Local museums in Oxfordshire
Religious museums in England
Christianity in Oxfordshire